Bethel African Methodist Episcopal Church is a historic African Methodist Episcopal church located at 369 Drayton Street in McClellanville, South Carolina. It was built around 1872, and is a one-story, rectangular frame vernacular Gothic Revival church.  It has a pedimented gable-front roof that supports a square-based steeple. A cemetery is on the property. It was added to the National Register of Historic Places in 2004.

References

African Methodist Episcopal churches in South Carolina
Churches on the National Register of Historic Places in South Carolina
Carpenter Gothic church buildings in South Carolina
Churches completed in 1872
19th-century Methodist church buildings in the United States
Churches in Charleston County, South Carolina
National Register of Historic Places in Charleston County, South Carolina